Iowa Wesleyan University is a private university in Mount Pleasant, Iowa. It is Iowa's first co-educational institution of higher learning and the oldest of its type west of the Mississippi River. The institution is affiliated with the United Methodist Church.

It was founded as the Mount Pleasant Literary Institute in 1842, and was known as Mount Pleasant Collegiate Institute from 1843 to 1855, Iowa Wesleyan University from 1855 to 1912, and Iowa Wesleyan College from 1912 to 2015. The name reverted to Iowa Wesleyan University in 2015.

Two campus buildings Old Main and the Harlan-Lincoln House are listed on the National Register of Historic Places. The latter, the former summer home of Robert Todd Lincoln, is now a museum featuring various artifacts from the Harlan and Lincoln families.

History
In 1841 a group of Methodist settlers in Mount Pleasant, Iowa, met and began lobbying the Iowa territorial legislature to establish an institute of higher learning in their burgeoning community. On February 17, 1842, the legislature granted a charter for the Mount Pleasant Literary Institute, soon to be renamed as Mount Pleasant Collegiate Institute. Despite the charter, organization and fund raising were sluggish at first. Twenty acres of land was donated for the campus by four Mount Pleasant residents in March 1843. That same month, organizing officials hired Reverend Artistides J. Heustis as the institution's first president.

From February 1855, the school was known as Iowa Wesleyan University, honoring John Wesley, the founder of Methodism The institution's name was modified to Iowa Wesleyan College in 1912, reflecting its contemporary status as a four-year baccalaureate degree institution of higher learning.

On August 10, 2015, Iowa Wesleyan adopted its new name: Iowa Wesleyan University, reflecting its broad educational opportunities and its roots as one of the oldest four-year co-educational church-related universities west of the Mississippi River.

The university occupies a 60-acre central campus of historic red brick buildings and modern structures, including some listed on the National Register of Historic Places. The chapel, built in 1896, received a complete renovation and restoration in the early 21st century.

Iowa Wesleyan is fully accredited by the Higher Learning Commission of the North Central Association of Colleges and Schools to offer academic programs leading to the Bachelor of Arts, Bachelor of Science, and Bachelor of Music Education degrees. Undergraduate enrollment at the college is approximately 600 full-time students. Christine Plunkett has been president of the university since August 2019.

Student life
Iowa Wesleyan University offers many activities for students outside the classroom, including the Student Government Association, the Student Union Board, Association of Student Athletes, Campus Ministry, Black Student Union, Hispanic Latino Alliance, Gender Sexuality Alliance, Student Nurses Association, Cheerleading, Dance Team, Intramurals, and Hall Councils. Field of interest clubs are available for Art, Behavioral Science, Business, Esports, Criminal Justice, Music Education, and Nursing. Iowa Wesleyan University also offers a number of performing groups such as the IW Choir, Primae Voces, IW Band, and IW Jazz Combo.

Beginning in late mid-1800s, Iowa Wesleyan maintained an active Military Department, in which students organized as a corps of cadets received training under the guidance of United States Army officers. Among Iowa Wesleyan's commandants were Ulysses G. McAlexander (1891 to 1895) and Charles L. Hodges (1895 to 1897)

Greek life
Greek life has a rich history at Iowa Wesleyan University.  The Beta chapter of Alpha Xi Delta sorority was the oldest sorority on campus, being on campus since 1902. It is the oldest chapter of Alpha Xi Delta in the country. Currently, Iowa Wesleyan University has 3 active Greek organizations, which include Theta Sigma Rho sorority, Zeta Psi Mu fraternity, and Omega Delta Alpha fraternity.

The P.E.O. Sisterhood was founded at Iowa Wesleyan University on January 21, 1869.

Greek organizations that have had chapters on campus include:
National Panhellenic Conference (NPC) Sororities:
Pi Beta Phi, 1868–2004
Phi Mu, 1914–1943
Zeta Tau Alpha, 1918–1987

North American Interfraternity Conference (IFC) Fraternities
Phi Delta Theta, 1871–2009
Beta Theta Pi, 1868–1915
Delta Tau Delta, 1875–1980
Sigma Phi Epsilon, 1913–1976
Lambda Chi Alpha, 1924–1974
Tau Kappa Epsilon, 1947–1954
Phi Kappa Tau, 1968–1984

Athletics
The Iowa Wesleyan athletic teams are called the Tigers. The university is a member of the National Association of Intercollegiate Athletics (NAIA), competing in the North Star Athletic Association (NSAA) for football, the Heart of America Athletic Conference (HAAC) for wrestling, and the Continental Athletic Conference as its primary home for all other sports as of the 2021–22 academic year.

Iowa Wesleyan competes in 16 intercollegiate varsity sports: Men's sports include baseball, basketball, cross country, football, golf, soccer, track & field and wrestling; while women's sports include basketball, cross country, golf, soccer, softball, track & field, volleyball and wrestling.

In 2015 and 2017, the men's basketball teams qualified for the USCAA Division I national tournament.

In 2014, 2015 and 2016, the women's basketball teams qualified for the USCAA Division I national tournament.  The 2016 team finished as the national runner-up.

In 2004, 2005, 2009 and 2011, the men's basketball teams qualified for the NAIA Division II national tournament.

In 2006, 2007, 2009, 2010, and 2011, the women's basketball teams qualified for the NAIA Division II national tournament.

In 2022, the women's basketball team qualified for the NAIA single division national tournament.

In 1995, the men's basketball team qualified for the NAIA Division I national tournament.

From 1989 to 1991, Hal Mumme was head football coach, with Mike Leach as his offensive coordinator. It was at Iowa Wesleyan that they developed the air raid offense.

Conference affiliations
Prior to July 2021, the Tigers were members of the following athletic organizations:

2021–22 to present – Continental Athletic Conference (CAC) - North Star Athletic Association (NSAA) - Heart of America Athletic Conference - National Association of Intercollegiate Athletics (NAIA)
 2017–18 to 2020–21 – St. Louis Intercollegiate Athletic Conference (SLIAC) – Upper Midwest Athletic Conference (UMAC) – National Collegiate Athletic Association (NCAA) Division III
 2013–14 to 2016–17 – St. Louis Intercollegiate Athletic Conference (SLIAC) – National Collegiate Athletic Association (NCAA) Division III (provisional member while associated with the United States Collegiate Athletic Association (USCAA))
 2012–13 – Independent - National Association of Intercollegiate Athletics (NAIA)
 1995–96 to 2011–12 – Midwest Collegiate Conference (MCC) – National Association of Intercollegiate Athletics (NAIA)
 1993–94 to 1994–95 – American Midwest Conference – National Association of Intercollegiate Athletics (NAIA)
 1974–75 to 1992–93 – Independent – National Association of Intercollegiate Athletics (NAIA)

Notable alumni
Warren Wallace Beckwith, minor league baseball player and historical figure
Bill Bedenbaugh, Co-Offensive Coordinator/OL Coach (University of Oklahoma)
William Andrews Clark, United States Senator and business magnate
Clement Isong, second governor of the Central Bank of Nigeria
George B. Corkhill, United States Attorney for the District of Columbia prosecuted Charles J. Guiteau for the assassination of James A. Garfield
Dana Holgorsen, head football coach (University of Houston)
Davey Lopes, former manager, Milwaukee Brewers baseball team; 16-year Major League Baseball career
Jessie Wilson Manning (1855-?) - author, lecturer
Belle Babb "Arabella" Mansfield, first woman lawyer in the United States
John H. Mickey, 17th governor of Nebraska (1903 to 1907)
Ola Babcock Miller, Iowa Secretary of State
Sandy Sandberg, American football player
James Van Allen, an astrophysicist who discovered the Van Allen radiation belt circling the earth
Peggy Whitson, former NASA Chief Astronaut and first female commander of the International Space Station

References

External links
 Official website
 Official athletic website
 
 

 
Educational institutions established in 1842
Education in Henry County, Iowa
Buildings and structures in Henry County, Iowa
USCAA member institutions
Mount Pleasant, Iowa
Private universities and colleges in Iowa